Masala railway station is a station on the Helsinki commuter rail network located in the Masala district of Kirkkonummi, Finland, between the Kauklahti and Jorvas stations. The station is served by Helsinki commuter rail lines Y, U and L. Westbound trains towards Kirkkonummi and Siuntio use track one, while eastbound trains to Helsinki use track two.

The station underwent a significant renovation in 2005. The old station building, built in 1963, was destroyed in a fire on January 14, 2011.

The Masala station has high platforms and platform displays. There is an announcement system at the station. The station has 140 free-of-charge bicycle parking places and 80 free-of-charge car parking places. There is a taxi station and bus stop near the station.

Connections
Y-line trains (Helsinki-Siuntio-Helsinki)
U-line trains (Helsinki-Kirkkonummi-Helsinki)
L-line trains (Helsinki-Kirkkonummi-Helsinki, nighttime)

References 

Kirkkonummi
Railway stations in Uusimaa